Michael Ventura (born October 31, 1945) is an American novelist, screenwriter, film director, essayist and cultural critic.

History
Michael Ventura commenced his career as a journalist at the Austin Sun, a counter-culture bi-weekly newspaper that published in the 1970s.  Ventura is best known for his long-running column, "Letters at 3 A.M.", which first appeared in LA Weekly in the early 1980s and continued in the Austin Chronicle until 2015.  He has published three novels: Night Time Losing Time (1989), The Zoo Where You're Fed to God (1994), and The Death of Frank Sinatra (1996).

An excerpt from his novel about Miriam of Magdala was published in the third issue of the CalArts literary journal Black Clock in 2005. He is the author of two essay collections, Shadow-Dancing in the U.S.A. (1985) and Letters at 3 A.M.: Reports on Endarkenment (1994).  With psychologist James Hillman, Ventura co-authored the 1992 bestseller We've Had a Hundred Years of Psychotherapy – And the World's Getting Worse.

He appears as a fictional character in Steve Erickson's 1996 novel, Amnesiascope.

He wrote the screenplay for Echo Park (1986), among other films, including Roadie (1980).

He curated the Sundance Festival's 1989 retrospective on John Cassavetes.

Bibliography

Novels 
 Night Time Losing Time (1989)
 The Zoo Where You're Fed to God (1994)
 The Death of Frank Sinatra (1996)

Nonfiction
 Shadow-Dancing in the U.S.A. (1985)
 We've Had a Hundred Years of Psychotherapy – And the World's Getting Worse (1992) (with James Hillman)
 Letters at 3 A.M.: Reports on Endarkenment (1994)
 Cassavetes Directs (2007)

Screenplays
 Roadie (1980)
 Echo Park (1986)

Film director
 I'm Almost Not Crazy: John Cassavetes, the Man and His Work (1984)

Awards
 USA PEN award
 Los Angeles Press Club Award
 Upton Sinclair Award

References

External links
 
 
 Archive of Ventura's column in the Austin Chronicle

1945 births
Living people
20th-century American novelists
American male screenwriters
American columnists
American male novelists
American film directors
American social commentators
American male essayists
20th-century American essayists
20th-century American male writers